The red-rimmed melania (Melanoides tuberculata), also known as Malayan livebearing snails or Malayan/Malaysian trumpet snails (often abbreviated to MTS) by aquarists, is a species of freshwater snail with an operculum, a parthenogenetic, aquatic gastropod mollusk in the family Thiaridae.

The common name comes from the presence of reddish spots on the otherwise greenish-brown shell.

The species name is sometimes spelled Melanoides tuberculatus, but this is incorrect because Melanoides Olivier, 1804 was clearly intended to be feminine because it was combined with the feminine specific epithet fasciolata in the original description.

This species is native to northern Africa and southern Asia, but it has been accidentally introduced in many other tropical and subtropical areas worldwide. It has also been accidentally introduced to heated aquaria in colder parts of the world.

Subspecies
 † Melanoides tuberculata dadiana (Oppenheim, 1919) 
 † Melanoides tuberculata monolithica (Bukowski, 1892) 
 † Melanoides tuberculata tegalensis (Oostingh, 1935) 
 Melanoides tuberculata tuberculata (O. F. Müller, 1774)

Shell description 

This species has an elongate, conical shell, which is usually light brown, marked with rust-colored spots. An operculum is present. In some places, such as in Israel, the shells are colored in black or dark brown, probably to help conceal the snail on the background of the basalt rocks of the Sea of Galilee (Kinnereth).

Shells of this species have 10–15 whorls.

Distribution 

This species is native to northern Africa and southern Asia.

in Africa
 Algeria, Burundi, The Democratic Republic of the Congo, Egypt, Eritrea, Ethiopia, Kenya, Libya, Malawi, Morocco, Mozambique, Namibia, Niger,
 South Africa (Eastern Cape Province, Free State, Gauteng, KwaZulu-Natal, Limpopo Province)
 Eswatini, Senegal, Sudan, Tanzania, Tunisia, Zimbabwe.

in Asia
 Bangladesh, Cambodia, China, India (including Andaman Islands), Israel of Japan, Laos, Malaysia (Peninsular Malaysia), Nepal, Saudi Arabia, Sri Lanka, Vietnam
 Thailand

Prehistoric localities include Gobero in Niger in 6200–5200 BCE.

Nonindigenous distribution 
 Cuba
 United States since the 1930s (see below)
 Latin America in the late 1960s
 Brazil – since 1967 (Ilha Grande in Rio de Janeiro in southeastern Brazil since 2004)
 Netherlands – before 1990
 New Zealand
 Venezuela
 
 Dominica
 Trinidad
 and others

This species can also be found in artificially-heated indoor habitats, such as aquaria in greenhouses, and similar biotopes:
 Czech Republic
 Germany
 Great Britain
 Slovakia – thermal brook in the wild.
 and others

Nonindigenous distribution in the United States 
This species has become established outside of its natural range in large part through the activities of aquarists. These snails were imported to the United States by the aquarium trade as early as the 1930s. Established populations exist from Florida to Texas, and the species may still be expanding its range in the West and Northeast.

Some of these exotic populations have become very large, with densities of  being reported from the St. Johns River in Florida. In some cases red-rimmed melanias are believed to have a negative impact on native snail populations.

The nonindigenous distribution includes the United States: Arizona; San Francisco Bay, California; Colorado; Florida; Hawai'i; Louisiana; Montana; North Carolina; Nevada; Oregon; Utah; Texas, and Fall River County in South Dakota, (unconfirmed in Virginia, and Wyoming.)

Ecology
This is primarily a burrowing species that tends to be most active at night.

Habitat 
Although normally a freshwater snail, this species is very tolerant of brackish water, and has been recorded in waters with a salinity of 32.5 ppt (1,024 specific gravity salinity).

It is however a warm-climate species. This information is helpful in the disinfection of fishing gear and research equipment, which otherwise may inadvertently spread the snails to uninfested waters.

This species is resistant to low oxygen levels. The pollution tolerance value is 3 (on scale 0–10; 0 is the best water quality, 10 is the worst water quality).

Feeding habits 
This snail feeds primarily on algae (microalgae).

Life cycle 
Red-rimmed melania females are both parthenogenic and ovoviviparous. Females can be recognized by their greenish coloured gonads while males have reddish gonads. Under good conditions, females will produce fertilised eggs that are transferred to a brood pouch where they remain until they hatch (parthenogenesis and viviparity). Melanoides tuberculata has 1–64 embryos in its brood pouch.

Melanoides tuberculata grows to a similar size as Tarebia granifera, are similar in size at first birth and juvenile output.

It is a r-strategist species.

Parasites 
Melanoides tuberculata is known to carry certain parasites which can be dangerous to humans. Pinto & de Melo (2011) compiled a checklist of 37 species of trematode parasites from this species of snail. Eleven of those trematodes are also parasites of human. These snails serve as first intermediate host for parasites which include:
 Clonorchis sinensis – Chinese liver fluke
 Centrocestus formosanus
 Paragonimus westermani – Oriental lung fluke
 Paragonimus kellicotti
 Angiostrongylus cantonensis
 Loxogenoides bicolor
 Transversotrema laruei
 Sticiodora tridactyl
 Gastrodiscus aegyptiacus
 Philophthalmus gralli
 Philophthalmus distomatosa
 Haplorchis pumilio
 Haplorchis sp.
 Metagonimus
 Diorchitrema formosanum
 unknown species in Schistosomatidae

This species is a host for a trematode parasite which has been found to infect an endangered species of fish in Texas, the fountain darter.

Agricultural pests
Red-rimmed melanias can sometimes be an agricultural pest species, as has been reported on Chinese cabbage plantations in Hong Kong.

Aquaria

Red-rimmed melanias are quite commonly found in freshwater aquaria, but opinion in the hobby is divided between those who see them as a pest species, and those who value their usefulness as algae-eaters and substrate-cleaners.

Synonyms
 Malanoides tuberculata [sic]  misspelling
 Melania (Melanoides) tuberculata (O. F. Müller, 1774) · alternate representation
 Melania (Stenomelania) rustica Mousson, 1857 junior subjective synonym
 Melania (Striatella) tuberculata (O. F. Müller, 1774) · alternate representation
 Melania (Striatella) tuberculata var. flavida G. Nevill, 1885 junior subjective synonym
 Melania (Striatella) tuberculata var. luteomarginata G. Nevill, 1885 junior subjective synonym
  † Melania (Striatella) woodwardi K. Martin, 1905 junior subjective synonym
 Melania baldwini Ancey, 1899 junior subjective synonym
 Melania beryllina Brot, 1860 junior subjective synonym
 Melania cancellata Say, 1829 junior subjective synonym
 Melania commersoni Morelet, 1860 junior subjective synonym
  † Melania distinguenda Brot, 1876 junior subjective synonym
 Melania dominula Tapparone Canefri, 1883 junior subjective synonym
 Melania exusta Reeve, 1859  junior subjective synonym
 Melania flammigera Dunker, 1844 junior subjective synonym
 Melania floricoma Reeve, 1859 junior subjective synonym
 Melania flyensis Tapparone Canefri, 1883 junior subjective synonym
 Melania gracilina A. Gould, 1859 junior subjective synonym
 Melania inhambanica E. von Martens, 1860  junior subjective synonym
 Melania javanica Brot, 1877  junior subjective synonym
 Melania judaica J. R. Roth, 1855 junior subjective synonym
 Melania layardi Dohrn, 1858 junior subjective synonym
 Melania lentiginosa var. nymphula Westerlund, 1883 junior subjective synonym
 Melania malayana Brot, 1877 junior subjective synonym
 Melania mauriciae Lesson, 1831 junior subjective synonym
 Melania moesta Hinds, 1844junior subjective synonym
 Melania nicobarica Tapparone Canefri, 1883  junior subjective synonym
 Melania ornata von dem Busch, 1842 junior homonym (invalid, not Michaud, 1828)
 Melania pellicens Tapparone Canefri, 1883 junior subjective synonym
 Melania punctulata Reeve, 1859 junior subjective synonym
 Melania pyramis Benson, 1836 junior subjective synonym
 Melania rivularis Philippi, 1847 junior subjective synonym
 Melania rodericensis E. A. Smith, 1876 junior subjective synonym
 Melania rothiana Mousson, 1861 junior subjective synonym
 Melania rubropunctata Tristram, 1865 junior subjective synonym
 Melania scalariformis Tenison Woods, 1879junior subjective synonym
 Melania singularis Tapparone Canefri, 1877  junior subjective synonym
 Melania suturalis Philippi, 1847  junior subjective synonym
 Melania tamsii Dunker, 1845  junior subjective synonym
 Melania terebra Lesson, 1831 junior subjective synonym
 Melania tigrina T. Hutton, 1849 junior subjective synonym
 Melania timorensis Reeve, 1859 junior subjective synonym (suspected synonym)
 Melania trunculata Lamarck, 1822 junior subjective synonym
 Melania tuberculata (O. F. Müller, 1774)  superseded combination
 Melania tuberculata var. angularis E. von Martens, 1897 junior subjective synonym (suspected synonym)
 Melania tuberculata var. malayana Issel, 1874 junior subjective synonym
 Melania tuberculata var. seminuda E. von Martens, 1897  junior subjective synonym (suspected synonym)
 Melania tuberculata var. victoriae Dautzenberg, 1908 > junior homonym (invalid: preoccupied by Melania victoriae Dohrn, 1865) 
 Melania turriculus I. Lea & H. C. Lea, 1851 junior subjective synonym
 Melania virgula Quoy & Gaimard, 1834  junior subjective synonym
 Melania virgulata Férussac, 1827 junior subjective synonym
 Melania waigiensis Brot, 1874  junior subjective synonym
 Melania wilkinsonii Tenison Woods, 1879 junior subjective synonym
 Melania zengana Morelet, 1860 junior subjective synonym
 Melanoides (Melanoides) tuberculata'' (O. F. Müller, 1774) · alternate representation
 Melanoides fasciolata Olivier, 1804  junior subjective synonym
 Melanoides flavidus (G. Nevill, 1885)  junior subjective synonym
 Melanoides pyramis (Benson, 1836) junior subjective synonym
 Melanoides pyramis var. flavida (G. Nevill, 1885) junior subjective synonym
 Melanoides pyramis var. leopardina Annandale & Prashad, 1919  junior subjective synonym
 Melanoides pyramis var. luteomarginata (G. Nevill, 1885) ·  > junior subjective synonym
 Melanoides pyramis var. puteicola Annandale & Prashad, 1919 junior subjective synonym
 Melanoides terebra (Lesson, 1831)  junior subjective synonym
 Melanoides tigrina (T. Hutton, 1850) junior subjective synonym
 Melanoides tuberculata var. dautzenbergi Pilsbry & Bequaert, 1927 junior subjective synonym (replacement name for Melania tuberculata var. victoriae Dautzenberg, 1908) 
 Melanoides tuberculatus (O. F. Müller, 1774) incorrect grammatical agreement of specific epithet
 Nerita tuberculata O. F. Müller, 1774 superseded combination
 Striatella tuberculata (O. F. Müller, 1774)  superseded combination (Striatella is a junior synonym of...) 
 Thiara baldwini (Ancey, 1899) junior subjective synonym
 Thiara rodericensis (E. A. Smith, 1876)  junior subjective synonym
 Thiara tuberculata (O. F. Müller, 1774)  superseded combination
 Turritella tuberculata Link, 1807 superseded combination
 Turritella turricula Link, 1807  junior subjective synonym

See also
List of introduced molluscs species of Venezuela

References
This article incorporates public domain text from references

 Further reading 
 
 
 

interactions with Biomphalaria glabrata:
 Pointier J. P. (1993). "The introduction of Melanoides tuberculata (Mollusca: Thiaridae) to the island of Saint Lucia (West Indies) and its role in the decline of Biomphalaria glabrata, the snail intermediate host of Schistosoma mansoni". Acta Trop. 54:13-18.
 Giovanelli A., Vieira M. V. & da Silva C. L. P. A. C. (2002) "Interaction between the Intermediate Host of Schistosomiasis in Brazil Biomphalaria glabrata (Planorbidae) and a Possible Competitor Melanoides tuberculata (Thiaridae): I. Laboratory Experiments." Memórias do Instituto Oswaldo Cruz'' 97(3): 363–369. PDF

External links

Thiaridae
Fishkeeping
Gastropods described in 1774
Gastropods of Asia
Gastropods of Africa
Taxa named by Otto Friedrich Müller